Faherty is an Irish surname that may refer to
Adrian Faherty (born 1988), Gaelic football goalkeeper with London
Jackie Faherty, American astronomer
JG Faherty (born 1961), American author
Terence Faherty (born 1954), American author of mystery novels 
Vinny Faherty (born 1987), Irish football player

Anglicised Irish-language surnames
Surnames of Irish origin